The American Board of Physical Therapy Specialties, often abbreviated ABPTS, is the organization responsible for certifying clinical specialists in physical therapy in the United States. It is a part of the American Physical Therapy Association (APTA).

See also
Physical therapy
American Physical Therapy Association

Physiotherapy organizations